The Things We've Seen is a 2017 American low budget drama film written and directed by Tre Manchester and produced by Don Bernacky, John Metzler, and Roger Welp. It tells the story of a boy who sets off to find his father after accusations of guilt turns the man into a fugitive.

The film was shot on location around the Crown Point, IN area and premiered in Lafayette, IN in January 2017. In March of that year, it made its film festival debut at the 20th George Lindsey UNA Film Festival where it went on to win Best Feature Film.

Plot summary
There is a strike at the local mill.  A stand off with the police gets a man killed with Ray and wounded Rick escaping.  As a result the mill, which is the sole employer in the county, burns to the ground.  The strike and the mill fire is a devastating loss to the rural community.  The Sheriff goes to Ivory Joyce Boem and tells her not to assist her husband Ray in any way. She and her two teen sons Reagan and Neely should get out of town.
 
Ray is a country singer and an absent father having left Ivory Joyce alone to raise her boys.  Reagan goes to find his father and the mother is furious to find Ray and his shot brother in her home. Ray tries to help Reagan play the guitar and explain his absence.  Rick dies and Ray and his two sons secretly bury him.  Later that night the Sheriff arrests Ray.

Ray tricks a deputy at the jail and escapes.  He returns to the Boem residence.  They all say their tearful goodbyes with Dad driving off alone. Ivory Joyce drives away down a dirt road with her sons.

Cast 
 Randy Ryan - Rayford Boem
 Jarrett Maier - Reagan Boem
 Shani Salyers Stiles - Ivory Joy Boem
 Noah McCarty-Slaughter - Neely Boem
 John D. Carver - Sheriff Pascal
 Jordon Hodges - Rick Boem

Production

Filming began in summer of 2015. Production occupied many scenic locations that were also featured in Michael Mann's drama Public Enemies (2009 film), including the downtown streets of Crown Point, Indiana.

The first draft of the film's screenplay was completed on September 7, 2014. The final draft was completed on September 2, 2015 just weeks before the final phase of principal photography. Filming was split into two phases beginning in June 2015, lasting four days. The cast and crew resumed production in late September 2015.

With its dark tone and contrasting visuals, the film was dubbed an "American Gothic" by The Film Yap. Much of the film's look and visual style was influenced and modeled upon the work of painter Edward Hopper.

Official film festival selections 
 George Lindsey UNA Film Festival | Florence, Alabama
 MayDay Film Festival Evansville, Indiana
 Julien Dubuque International Film Festival | Dubuque, Iowa
 Hobnobben Film Festival | Fort Wayne, Indiana
 Indy Film Festival | Indianapolis, Indiana
 Columbia Gorge International Film Festival | Big Bear Lake, California
 50th Worldfest Houston International Film Festival | Houston, Texas
 River Bend Film Festival | Goshen, Indiana
 Covellite Film Festival | Butte, Montana
 Louisville International Festival of Film | Louisville, Kentucky
 Calcutta International Cult Film Festival | Kolkata, India
 Mediterranean Film Festival | Syracuse, Sicily

Nominations 
 "Best Picture" | Houston Critic's Choice Society
 "Best Actress" | Houston Critic's Choice Society
 "Best Supporting Actor" | Houston Critic's Choice Society
 "Best Young Performer" | Houston Critic's Choice Society

Awards 
 "Best Original Screenplay" - The Things We've Seen | Columbia Gorge International Film Festival
 "Best Feature" - The Things We've Seen | Mediterranean Film Festival
 "Outstanding Achievement Award" - The Things We've Seen | Calcutta International Cult Film Festival
 "Professional Narrative Feature" - The Things We've Seen | George Lindsey UNA Film Festival
 "Best Feature" - The Things We've Seen  | MayDay Film Festival
 "Best Actor" - The Things We've Seen  | MayDay Film Festival
 "Best Actress" - The Things We've Seen  | MayDay Film Festival
 "Gold Remi Award" - The Things We've Seen  | 50th Worldfest Houston International Film Festival

External links
 
 Sound & Picture Magazine
 Microfilmmaker Magazine

References

2010s English-language films